Tjong Yong Hian (1850–1911) was a Hakka Chinese businessman and kapitan who had a great contribution to the development of society in the city of Medan around the early 1900s, he is also brother of Tjong A Fie, the successor kapitan after him.

He began to enter Indonesia in 1867 or when he was about 17 years old, Tjong Yong Hian also known as Zhang Yu Nan or Zhang Rong Xuan, descended from a Hakka family, was born in Guangdong, Songkou city, Meixian District, South China, in 1850. He migrated from China to Indonesia, departed through the port of Shantou and sailed across the South China Sea, after sailing for 21 days, he landed in Jakarta (formerly Batavia), in 1867 at the age of 17 years. Three years later, having had sufficient savings, Tjong Yong Hian left Batavia for Medan, Sumatra, with the intention of starting his own business. Tjong Yong Hian is fluent in Malay which is a respectable language in North Sumatra.

Early life 
Tjong was born under the name Tjong Yu Nam (spelled in Hakka Chinese) from the Hakka lineage in Guangdong (formerly known as Canton) at year 1850. He was also known as Tjong Rong Xuan, and later in his life finally known as Tjong Yong Hian (spelled in Hakka Chinese)

He migrated from China to Indonesia, departed through the port of Shantou and sailed across the South China Sea, after sailing for 21 days, he landed in Batavia (present Jakarta), in 1867 at the age of 17 years.

Prominence in Medan 

In 1870 started his own business
Established N.V. Wan Yun Chong. His business grew rapidly to invest in sugarcane, tobacco, rubber and other agriculture plantations. He worked closely with his former employer in Batavia, namely Cheong Fatt Tze to start a plantation company in Yogyakarta. growing rubber, coconut, coffee and tea. They own hundreds of square kilometers of land, include 8 rubber plantations and a tea processing factory, thus providing employment for thousands of people. Then opened a Jogja bank in collaboration with Cheong Fatt Tze. With the help of his younger brother Tjong A Fie, Tjong business is growing more and more, trying again in the field of real estate development, in Medan, which is known as the Kesawan area. In 1907 he founded the Deli bank with his brother Tjong A Fie, where Bank Deli tried to eliminate the monopoly of the Dutch East Indies Bank, where the Dutch East Indies Bank had a complicated procedure for sending money to China by overseas Chinese in Sumatra. His business spread to various parts of the world, with the largest capital capitalization in Southeast Asia at that time. The Tjong brothers again collaborated with Tjong Fatt Tze to establish two shipping companies, in Batavia and Medan named Yi Chong and Fuk Guang.

Tjong Yong Hian was appointed by the Dutch as major and his younger brother Tjong A Fie was appointed as lieutenant. Major is the rank of middle officer, the lowest rank in the army, one level below lieutenant colonel and one level above captain.
Tjong Yong Hian was highly respected by the Chinese community and highly respected by the Dutch government.

In 1904, Tjong Yong Hian received the highest award from the Netherlands, for his dedication to the sacrifice of energy, thought and time, for the success of a noble cause: dedication to carrying out noble ideals for humanity.

His contribution in the construction of the Great Mosque of Medan, the Hospital in Belawan, the Tian Hou Temple, and the Old Mosque in Gang Bengkok. With the presence of Tjong Yong Hian, we can see how the harmony between religious communities in ancient times was. Helping each other in building houses of worship for every people, even if they differ in religion, race, and ethnicity.*

Tjong Yong Hian owns two banks
The first is the Jogja bank, which is a joint venture with his former employer, Tjong Bi Shi, and the second is the Deli bank, which is jointly owned by his younger brother Tjong A Fie and his friends.

One form of appreciation and appreciation given by the Medan City Government to Tjong Yong Hian (the brother of Tjong A Fie) is to change the name of Jalan Bogor to Jalan Tjong Yong Hian and inaugurate Tjong Yong Hian Park at Jalan Attorney Medan. The closing and inauguration of the park was witnessed directly by the heir and descendant of Tjong Yong Hian, namely Budihardjo Chandra (Chang Hung Kuin). The award given by the Medan City Government to the family of the late. Tjong Yong Hian is also a form of gratitude for the contribution of Tjong Yong Hian who has participated in building the city of Medan in the past. Tjong Yong Hian Park, located on Jalan Prosecutor's Office, Medan, is the final resting place of Tjong Yong Hian and his wife. At the entrance gate to this area is written Flower Garden Garden (Mao Rong Yuan), after entering a few meters inside, above the green gated entrance there is written Tjong Yong Hian Park.

Later life 

Tjong Yong Hian's contribution to Medan, Penang and China has received attention and appreciation with a title from the Qing Government for his social contribution in China. He also had the honor of being received twice in Beijing by Empress Ci Xi and Emperor Guang Xu. In 1904, for his contribution to the development of Medan Tjong Yong Hian was given an award by naming a busy street Jalan Tjong Yong Hian, later changed to Jalan Bogor. In conjunction with the 2013 Heroes' Day, Jalan Bogor was re-paved to become Jalan Tjong Yong Hian by the Acting Mayor of Medan Dzulmi Eldin.

Tjong Yong Hian has many houses in Medan as well as several houses in his hometown of China. The address in China is: Guangdong City, Meizhou province, Meizhou state, South Songnan village. He and his wife (Nee Xu) have three sons Pu Ching, Cen Ching and Min Ching and four daughters. The Tjong family's house in Medan was located on Jalan Kesawan (now Jalan A. Yani). While in China, Tjong and his ancestors have a home in Meixian, China. Tjong Yong Hian died at the age of 61 years (11 September 1911), thousands of mourners from all ethnicities and nationalities. Tjong Yong Hian's final resting place is at Mao Rong Park, a park he owns in the Medan Prosecutors' Street area. While in Tjong Yong Hian Park, the area is not like the original anymore. The fiery red tomb of Tjong Yong Hian and his wife overlooks the lotus pond. This park is maintained because it is cared for by the great-grandson of Tjong Yong Hian, Budihardjo Chandra (Chang Hung Kuin), the fourth generation, and his family.

After his death in 1911, his eldest son Chang Pu Ching and his brother continued his father's social activities by building the Tjong Yong Hian bridge across the Babura River (Jalan KH. Zainul Arifin). Now the bridge is named the Benevolent Bridge and has been used as one of the historical and cultural heritages of the city of Medan, and was awarded the 2003 Unesco Award Of Merit.

Family and personal life 

The second generation, Chang Pu Ching/Tjong Hau Lung, Chan Cen Ching/Tjong Hian Lung and Chang Min Ching/Tjong Seng Lung, are still in the Indonesian environment during the Dutch colonial period. The Ministry of Commerce of the Qing Kingdom, China appointed Chang Pu Ching as inspector to oversee the railway construction project between the city of Chao Chow and the city of Chow Shan Tou, this is because the previous owners of the railway construction company were Tjong Yong Hian and his younger brother Tjong A Fie. In 1904 Tjong A Fie's children were still in school.

The third generation at that time faced a political situation that was vulnerable, where Indonesia at that time was bearing a large foreign debt as a result of the vacancy of the State treasury because it had just become independent, then post-independence. The chaotic and unstable political conditions made the descendants of the third generation scatter to save themselves abroad, some to China, Malaysia, Europe, etc. This makes the Family Company also neglected without the control of its leadership.

Another fourth generation, Budiharjo, in 1972, opened the Indonesian Packaging Industry (IPI) factory in a joint venture with his sister who currently resides in Singapore and with another good friend of his, William Tiopan. IPI's business was developed again. Budiharjo opened a paper factory to supply paper raw materials to IPI, namely PT. Evergreen International Paper. Budiharjo's business was also developed by Budiharjo's son into the palm oil sector and housing construction as well as warehousing development, as well as a palm oil factory (PKS).

References
 Tjong Yong Hian Abang Kandung Tjong A Fie. semedan.com. Agustus 2015.
 Jembatan Kebajikan. semedan.com. Agustus 2018
 Masjid bengkok Medan. semedan.com. Agustus 2018
 Taman kebun bunga, Makam Tjong Yong Hian . benerada.com.
 Sejarah kontribusi dari suku Tong Hoa .

 http://repositori.usu.ac.id/bitstream/handle/123456789/11261/138122003.pdf?sequence=1&isAllowed= https://id.m.wikipedia.org/wiki/Tjong_A_Fie

1850 births
1911 deaths
Chinese philanthropists
Indonesian people of Chinese descent
Indonesian philanthropists
Indonesian businesspeople
People from Medan
People from Meixian District
Chinese emigrants to Indonesia
Kapitan Cina
Businesspeople from Meizhou